James or Jimmy Westbrook may refer to:

Jimmy Westbrook, character in Captain America and the Falcon
Jimi Westbrook, musician in Little Big Town
James Westbrook (judoka), participated in Judo at the 1967 Pan American Games